Denis Chalifoux (born November 9, 1955) is a Quebec politician.  He was a member of the National Assembly of Quebec from 2007 to 2008.

He was elected in a by-election in Bertrand for the Quebec Liberal Party on October 6, 1997.  However, he was defeated in the 2008 Quebec election.

He was a city councillor in Sainte-Agathe-des-Monts, Quebec from 1990 to 1997, and in 2009 was elected mayor. He served as mayor until 2021.

References

1955 births
Living people
Mayors of places in Quebec
People from Sainte-Agathe-des-Monts
Quebec Liberal Party MNAs